Dave the Resurrector was a so-called "resurrector bot" that responded to any attempts at canceling a message on the usenet newsgroup news.admin.net-abuse by re-posting the message. It was written by Chris Lewis.

The bot is notable as one of the first escalations in the spam arms race.

See also
Cancelbot, a process that sends out cancel messages

Notes

References
 
 

Anti-spam
Newsgroups